Wallace's Tower is a ruined 16th-century L-plan tower house, about  south west Kelso, Scottish Borders, Scotland, in Roxburgh, west of the River Teviot.

History
The property belonged to the Kerrs of Cessford. A charter of 1543, which confirmed Walter Ker of Cessford as owner of the lands of the East Mains of Roxburgh, mentions the tower. It has been suggested that it formed part of a chain of signal towers created to warn of English incursions.

Structure
The tower comprised a main block, with a vaulted basement, and a stair wing, with a tower added at a corner.  The main tower was rectangular, with the wings on its north.  
The tower is constructed of freestone rubble. Its windows, which are small, have rounded arises.

See also
Castles in Great Britain and Ireland
List of castles in Scotland

References

Castles in the Scottish Borders